Pečovská Nová Ves is a village and municipality in Sabinov District in the Prešov Region of north-eastern Slovakia.

History
In historical records the village was first mentioned in 1319.

Geography
The municipality lies at an altitude of 348 metres and covers an area of 11.754 km². It has a population of 2355 people (01.01.2008).

Main sights
Church of St. Andrew (Kostol sv. Ondreja) - named by the patron saint of village
Jewish cemetery
Chapel of St. John of Nepomuk - Main street

Sport
The village has also football club named TJ Slovan and own football playground.

Transport

Rail
Small train station is located in village.

Famous people born in Pečovská Nová Ves
Milena Dudasova, the United Nations youth ambassador for Slovakia.

External links
http://www.statistics.sk/mosmis/eng/run.html
http://www.panoramyslovenska.sk/Panorama/Pecovska-nova-ves-pri-sabinove.html

Villages and municipalities in Sabinov District